"Twilight Zone" is a 1992 song recorded by Belgian/Dutch Eurodance band 2 Unlimited. It was the second single released from their debut album, Get Ready! (1992). The UK release of the single was the first 2 Unlimited single to include the vocals of Anita Doth, as they had not been featured on their debut hit "Get Ready for This". However, Ray Slijngaard's raps were once again removed. The instrumental "Rave" version of the track sounds different from the original "Not Enough" version, with a more Hi-NRG style with more bass and added cowbells. The single scored chart success in many European countries, topping the chart in both Finland and the Netherlands. "Twilight Zone" was the second single in a row to just miss out on the top spot in the UK again, peaking at number two. But it was 2 Unlimited's biggest hit on the US Billboard Hot Dance Club Play chart, reaching number five, and it won an award in the category for Best Techno 12-inch Single on the 1993 WMC International Dance Music Awards.

Background and release
Producer Jean-Paul De Coster told about the song in an interview with Pan-European magazine Music & Media, "The new single Twilight Zone is even more accessible than its predecessor ["Get Ready for This"]. We call it 'happy house'. In fact, it all comes from the same origins. Just like rock 'n' roll, this music always evoluates."

Critical reception
Victoria Thieberger from The Age wrote, "The track is propelled by a high-tech beat and dramatic changes in melody and attitude that make it sound like three songs tacked together, punctuated by an occasional "whoo!"" rap in the vocal mix "gives it a harder edge, providing a central focus for the variations that spin around it. The end result is an entertaining dance track of more than average complexity and a decided lyrical development from "Get Ready For This"." Larry Flick from Billboard deemed it "a swirling techno rave that is etched with sweet and tuneful pop/NRG nuances. Tough enough to please hardcore punters, though mainstreamers will find track palatable as well." James Hamilton from Music Week'''s RM Dance Update stated that Stock & Waterman's "Belgian" act "returns with another synth stabbed simplistic Mecca-aimed raver, jerkily galloping through". Sian Pattenden from Smash Hits viewed it as "an averagely bouncy rave tune."

Chart performance
"Twilight Zone" was very successful on the charts across several continents. In Europe, it peaked at number-one in Finland and the Netherlands. Additionally,
it made it to the top 10 also in Austria, Belgium, Greece (number two), Ireland, Portugal, Spain (number three), Sweden and the United Kingdom, as well as on the Eurochart Hot 100 and MTV's European Top 20. In the UK, "Twilight Zone" peaked at number two in its third week on the UK Singles Chart, on February 2, 1992. It was held off reaching the top spot by Wet Wet Wet's "Goodnight Girl". On the UK Dance Singles Chart, it hit number four. Outside Europe, the single reached number-one on the RPM Dance/Urban chart and number 15 on the RPM Top Singles chart in Canada, number five on the US Billboard Hot Dance Club Play chart, number 22 on the Billboard Hot Dance Music/Maxi-Singles Sales chart and number 49 on the Billboard Hot 100. In Australia, it went to number eleven.

Music video
The accompanying music video for "Twilight Zone" was directed by British director David Betteridge. He had previously directed the video for the band's first hit, "Get Ready for This". "Twilight Zone" was later published on 2 Unlimited's official YouTube channel in July 2014. The video has amassed more than 7,6 million views as of November 2021.

Appearances
The song has become a staple of National Hockey League teams, as many of them play an instrumental loop of the song during games.  Its popularity in the NHL may have been inspired by Ray Slijngaard wearing a Los Angeles Kings hoodie in the music video. It has also been used in NHL 11's "EA Trax" soundtrack.

The song's B4 Za Beat Mix (2:15) was included on Dancemanias Speed 5 and Speed Best 2001.

The song appeared on Witch, the third episode of Buffy the Vampire Slayer, playing for a cheerleading hopeful whose hands spontaneously combusted in the middle of her tryout.

The song was remixed as "Techno Syndrome" by the Immortals, the main theme of the Mortal Kombat franchise. Immortals members Olivier Adams and Maurice Engelen have claimed the resemblance to be a coincidence, and that no legal action was taken.

Track listings

 7-inch single "Twilight Zone" (7" Vocal/Not Enough Version Edit) — 4:09
 "Twilight Zone" (7" Instrumental/Rave Version Edit) — 4:09

 12-inch maxi "Twilight Zone" (Rave Version) — 5:42
 "Twilight Zone" (Rapping Rave Version) — 5:40
 "Twilight Zone" (Rio & Le Jean Remix) — 4:41

 CD single, Australia "Twilight Zone" (7" Instrumental) — 3:16
 "Twilight Zone" (7" Vocal) — 4:11
 "Twilight Zone" (Rave Version) — 5:43

(Note: Track 1 is the PWL 7" edit, which is based on the Rave Version but adds some of Anita's vocals, specifically her "This is the twilight zone" chorus from the vocal arrangements to give it a slight "verse-chorus-verse" arrangement.)

 CD single, UK "Twilight Zone" (7" Edit) — 3:18
 "Twilight Zone" (Rave Version) — 5:42
 "Twilight Zone" (Rapping Rave Version) — 5:40

 CD maxi "Twilight Zone" (Rave Version) — 5:42
 "Twilight Zone" (Rapping Rave Version) — 5:40
 "Twilight Zone" (Not Enough Version) — 5:41
 "Twilight Zone" (Rio & Le Jean Remix) — 4:10
 "Twilight Zone" (7" Vocal/Not Enough Version Edit) — 4:10
 "Twilight Zone" (7" Instrumental/Rave Version Edit) — 4:09

 CD maxi, France "Twilight Zone" (Radio Version) — 3:58
 "Twilight Zone" (Not Enough Version) — 5:40
 "Twilight Zone" (Rave Version) — 4:46
 "Twilight Zone" (Rio & Le Jean Remix) — 4:43

Charts

Weekly charts

Year-end charts

Millennium Remixes

Following the bleak success of the "No Limit" single came the "Twilight Zone (Millennium Remixes)". It had the same success as its predecessor, although the remixes were more commercial and radio-friendly. It received good airplay in Europe but had very little success in the charts.

Track listings

 12" single, Europe "Twilight Zone" (DJ Jean Club Mix) — 7:18
 "Twilight Zone" (DJ Jean Dub Mix) — 5:46
 "Twilight Zone" (Sharp 'Maniac' Mix) — 7:15

 12" single, Japan (Promo) "Twilight Zone" (R-Control Mix) — 5:43
 "Twilight Zone" (R-C Extended Club Mix) — 7:20
 "Twilight Zone" (Sharp 'Maniac' Mix) — 7:15
 "Let the Beat Control Your Body" (I.O. Sonic Remix) — 4:55

 CD single "Twilight Zone" (DJ Jean Edit) — 3:15
 "Twilight Zone" (Delvino Remix Edit) — 3:35

 CD maxi'''
 "Twilight Zone" (DJ Jean Edit) — 3:15
 "Twilight Zone" (DJ Jean Club Mix) — 7:18
 "Twilight Zone" (DJ Jean Dub Mix) — 5:46
 "Twilight Zone" (Sharp 'Maniac' Mix) — 7:15

References

2 Unlimited songs
1991 songs
1992 singles
Byte Records singles
Dutch Top 40 number-one singles
English-language Dutch songs
Music videos directed by David Betteridge
Number-one singles in Finland
Pete Waterman Entertainment singles
Songs written by Phil Wilde
ZYX Music singles